2nd Independent Division of Hebei Provincial Military District was formed in July 1966 from the Public Security Contingent of Hebei province. The division was composed of five regiments (7th to 11th).

In February 1969 it moved to Shanxi province and became the second formation of Independent Division of Shanxi Provincial Military District() with all but 8th Infantry Regiments. The 8th Infantry became 4th Infantry Regiment, Independent Division of Hebei Provincial Military District.

The 7th, 9th, 10th and 11th Infantry Regiments were renamed as 1st, 2nd, 3rd, 4th Infantry Regiments of the division.

In September 1976 the division was disbanded.

References
中国各省军区独立师的历史沿革, https://web.archive.org/web/20160918225002/http://www.360doc.com/content/13/1205/20/1164894_334784330.shtml

Infantry divisions of the People's Liberation Army
Military units and formations established in 1966
Military units and formations disestablished in 1976